El Original is one of the first Argentine Cumbia bands.  

El Original's usage of sound effects distinguishes them from other Cumbia bands. Tracks on their albums make use of dance, sensual, and romantic styles.

Discography
Dando clase 
"Tiene Fuego"
"La Batidora"
"Amor De Colegio"
"Quiero Contigo A. Arenas"
"Bate Ke Bate"

"1, 2, 3"
"Sigo Aquí"
"La Colita"
"Tu Sabes Amar"

Y Con Este Te Quedastes
"Te Hago El Amor"
"Cintura"
"Boricua"
"No Puedo Vivir Sin Ti"
"Quiero Ver"
"Mis Chicas"
"Mueve Tu Cuerpo"
"Chica Indicada"
"Pa Adentro"
"Cumbietón"
"Ponte A Gozar"
"Dámelo"
"Te Hago El Amor (remix)"
"No Puedo Vivir Sin Ti (remix)"
"Boricua (remix)"
"Quiero Ver (remix)"

El Bombazo
"El bombazo"
"Macarena"
"Me tienes que olvidar (Letra)"
"Pa lo borracho"
"Llegó el original"
"Se baila así"
"Re loco"
"Tu cola redonda"
"Ritmo sensual"
"Bien Buena"
"Alta Yanta"
"Yo soy tu maestro (Letra)"
"Este verano"
"Escucha"
"Manos arriba"
"Yo soy tu maestro (remix)"
"Me tienes que olvidar (remix)"
"El Bombazo (remix)"
"Macarena (remix)"

Puro Movimiento
"La Bomba"
"Marina"
"Nada que perder"
"Alza las manos"
"La Psicopedelica"
"Llegó el original"
"Cumbia viciosa"
"Ritmo sonidero"
"Re loco por su amor"
"Repiola"
"Cumbia de barrio"

References

External links
 http://www.cumbiadenegros.net/
 http://www.muevamueva.com/grupo/eloriginal/index.htm

Argentine musical groups